Beyne-Heusay is a municipality of Wallonia located in the province of Liège, Belgium. 

On January 1, 2006, Beyne-Heusay had a total population of 11,711. The total area is 7.32 km² which gives a population density of 1,600 inhabitants per km².

The municipality consists of the following districts: Bellaire, Beyne-Heusay, and Queue-du-Bois.

Twin towns
 Wasquehal in France

Image gallery

References

External links
 
 Official website

Municipalities of Liège Province